Michelangelo Maestri was an Italian artist of the 18th century who died in Rome in 1812. His finest compositions are based on motifs from antique frescos discovered in Pompeii and Herculaneum and from designs by Raphael or his pupil Giulio Romano. His work became very popular and often purchased  by European travelers during their Grand Tour.

Some of his most famous gouaches  portray putti leading animals on a chariot and were inspired by ceiling frescoes in the salone of Villa Lante, on the Janiculum Hill in Rome. Francesco Piranesi and Tommaso Piroli published these frescoes in a series of engravings in 1805 and attributed each drawing to Giulio Romano. Maestri probably knew the engravings as his inscriptions beneath the framing lines (describing the different types of love) are similar to those reported by Piranesi and Piroli.

References 

M. Natale, Musée d'art et d'histoire Genève, Peintures italiennes du XIVe au XVIIIe siècle, Geneva, 1979, p. 569-570.
T. Carunichio, Villa Lante al Gianicolo: storia della fabbrica e cronaca degli abitatori, Rome, 2005, figs. 112–4, 118–9.

External links 

Michelangelo Maestri British Museum

18th-century Italian painters
Italian male painters
19th-century Italian painters
1812 deaths
Year of birth missing
19th-century Italian male artists
18th-century Italian male artists